Laurens Jacobsz Alteras was a 17th-century Dutch vice admiral who distinguished himself as fleet commander under Jacob van Heemskerck in the battle of Gibraltar of 1607.

After the battle and Van Heemskerck's death, he took control of the Dutch fleet. He died on 16 October 1622, having successfully defended a Dutch merchant fleet from an attack by a Spanish armada.

Bibliography

External links 
 

16th-century Dutch people
17th-century Dutch military personnel
1622 deaths
Admirals of the navy of the Dutch Republic
Dutch military personnel killed in action
Dutch people of the Eighty Years' War (United Provinces)
People from Vlissingen
Year of birth unknown